The 1989–90 Alabama Crimson Tide men's basketball team represented the University of Alabama in the 1989-90 NCAA Division I men's basketball season. The team's head coach was Wimp Sanderson, who was in his tenth season at Alabama. The team played their home games at Coleman Coliseum in Tuscaloosa, Alabama. They finished the season with a record of 26–9, 12–6 in conference, good for second behind Georgia.

The Tide lost Michael Ansley and Alvin Lee to graduation, but plenty of talent remained in Robert Horry, David Benoit, Keith Askins, and Melvin Cheatum.

The Tide won the 1990 SEC men's basketball tournament, their second straight SEC tournament title, beating Ole Miss in the final and earning another automatic bid to the NCAA tournament.  The Tide advanced all the way to the Sweet 16, defeating Colorado State and Arizona before losing to Loyola Marymount.

Roster

Rankings

References 

Alabama Crimson Tide men's basketball seasons
Alabama
Alabama
1989 in sports in Alabama
1990 in sports in Alabama